Cesare Maniago (born January 13, 1939) is a Canadian former professional ice hockey goaltender. Maniago played the majority of his National Hockey League (NHL) career for the Minnesota North Stars, for whom he stands second all-time in games played in goal.

Playing career 
Originally the property of the Toronto Maple Leafs, the young goalie played seven games for the Leafs in the 1960–61 season. Picked up by the Montreal Canadiens in the inter-league draft the following season, Maniago underwent a lengthy apprenticeship in the minor leagues, spending the better part of five years on the farm. The high point of his years with Montreal was a 14-game stint in relief of the ailing Jacques Plante during the 1963 season. He had a sparkling season for the Minneapolis Bruins of the Central Hockey League in 1965, winning the league's most valuable player award, after which he was dealt to the New York Rangers. Maniago competed against Ed Giacomin and Don Simmons for the starting goal position in 1966, playing 28 games for the last place team. On March 12, 1966, in Chicago, Maniago allowed the Chicago Black Hawks' star left winger Bobby Hull's 51st goal of the season, the first time in league history that any player had scored more than 50 goals in one year. After the game, Maniago insisted that Chicago's crafty forward Eric Nesterenko had interfered with him during the play: "Nesterenko lifted the blade of my stick, and the puck went under it." Giacomin firmly won the job the next season as the much-improved Rangers made the playoffs, and Maniago played in just six games as his backup.

Minnesota 
With expansion arriving the next season, Maniago had his opportunity. He was the first draft choice of the expansion Minnesota North Stars, immediately becoming their number one goaltender, a job he kept for the next nine seasons. Maniago's play led the North Stars into the playoffs five of their first six seasons. One of his best years was his first with the team, where he had career highs in wins and shutouts while leading underdog Minnesota into the 1967-68 West Division semi-finals. The North Stars struggled the next season, finishing in last place and missing the playoffs.

Unable to find a suitable goalie to help Maniago with the workload (the other goalies the team tried went a combined 11-35-16 in Minnesota's first three seasons) the North Stars obtained Gump Worsley's rights  from the Canadiens, talking him out of retirement in 1970. The late-season addition rejuvenated the struggling team, who finished strongly, ending up in third place. Over the next three seasons the tandem led the North Stars into the playoffs, including an appearance against Montreal in the 1971 semifinals. In this series, Minnesota was the first expansion team to defeat an Original Six team in a playoff game, beating the Canadiens twice.

Starting in 1974, the fortunes of the Minnesota club sagged and Maniago's play suffered as well. After that season Worsley retired, leaving Maniago as the sole experienced goalie on the struggling team. After the 1976 season, he was traded to the Vancouver Canucks, for whom he played his two final seasons.

Legacy 
Maniago retired with 190 wins in 568 games, recording 30 shutouts and a career 3.27 goals against average, leading Minnesota goaltenders in every meaningful statistical category. At the time of his retirement, he was in the top 25 in NHL history in shutouts, fifth in all-time losses and twelfth in all-time games played.

After his retirement, Maniago served several seasons as the Canucks' goaltender coach.

Maniago remains second in all-time games played and minutes played in net for the Minnesota/Dallas franchise behind Marty Turco, and is third in wins and shutouts to Ed Belfour and Turco.

Career statistics

Regular season and playoffs

References

External links
 

1939 births
Living people
Baltimore Clippers players
Canadian people of Italian descent
Canadian ice hockey goaltenders
Ice hockey people from British Columbia
Minnesota North Stars players
Montreal Canadiens players
New York Rangers players
Quebec Aces (AHL) players
Spokane Comets players
Sportspeople from Trail, British Columbia
Toronto Maple Leafs players
Toronto St. Michael's Majors players
Vancouver Canucks players